Colostrum, or first milk, is the first form of milk produced by the mammary glands of humans and other mammals immediately following delivery of the newborn. It may be called beestings when referring to the first milk of a cow or similar animal.  Most species will begin to generate colostrum just prior to giving birth. Colostrum has an especially high amount of bioactive compounds compared to mature milk to give the newborn the best possible start to life. Specifically, colostrum contains antibodies to protect the newborn against disease and infection, and immune and growth factors and other bioactives that help to activate a newborn's immune system, jumpstart gut function, and seed a healthy gut microbiome in the first few days of life. The bioactives found in colostrum are essential for a newborn's health, growth and vitality.  Colostrum strengthens a baby's immune system and is filled with white blood cells to protect it from infection. 

At birth, the surroundings of the newborn mammal change from the relatively sterile environment in the mother's uterus, with a constant nutrient supply via the placenta, to the microbe-rich environment outside, with irregular oral intake of complex milk nutrients through the gastrointestinal tract. This transition puts high demands on the gastrointestinal tract of the neonate, as the gut plays an important part in both the digestive system and the immune system. Colostrum has evolved to care for highly sensitive mammalian neonates and contributes significantly to initial immunological defense as well as to the growth, development, and maturation of the neonate's gastrointestinal tract by providing key nutrients and bioactive factors. Bovine colostrum powder is rich in protein and low in sugar and fat. Bovine colostrum can also be used for a range of conditions in humans, and can boost a neonate's immunity. 

Colostrum also has a mild laxative effect, encouraging the passing of a baby's first stool, which is called meconium.  This clears excess bilirubin, a waste-product of dead red blood cells which is produced in large quantities at birth due to blood volume reduction from the infant's body and which also helps prevent jaundice.

Bioactive components in colostrum 
Newborns have very immature and small  digestive systems, and colostrum delivers its bioactives in a very concentrated low-volume form.  Colostrum is known to contain immune cells (as lymphocytes) and many antibodies such as IgA,  IgG, and IgM.  These are some of the components of the adaptive immune system. Other immune components of colostrum include the major components of the innate immune system, such as lactoferrin, lysozyme, lactoperoxidase, complement, and proline-rich polypeptides (PRP). A number of cytokines (small messenger peptides that control the functioning of the immune system) are found in colostrum as well, including interleukins, tumor necrosis factor, chemokines, and others.

Colostrum also contains a number of growth factors, such as insulin-like growth factors I (IGF-1), and II, transforming growth factors alpha, beta 1 and beta 2, fibroblast growth factors, epidermal growth factor, granulocyte-macrophage-stimulating growth factor, platelet-derived growth factor, vascular endothelial growth factor, and colony-stimulating factor-1.

Human colostrum 

Colustrum, which is produced for the first two to four days after childbirth, enhances immunity and is believed to have anti-inflammatory properties. It is suggested infants fed with human colostrum have lower incidence of gastrointestinal infections.

Human consumption of bovine colostrum 
While it has long been understood that the colostrum a mother produces is vital to a newborn's health in the first few days of life, research has shown that bovine (cow) colostrum and its components can continue to support important biological activities when given to more mature children and adults, so that the benefits of colostrum can extend well beyond the neonatal period of development.

Bovine colostrum and human colostrum are highly similar in their makeup, both containing many of the same antibodies, immune and growth factors, and other nutrients. Because they share so many of the same components, the way they work in the body is also highly similar. The benefit of bovine colostrum for human health has been studied in many areas including:

 Immune health: Colostrum is composed of a powerful combination of bioactives that support immune health, including immunoglobulins, immune modulators, and oligosaccharides. These bioactives have been shown to work together to support not only the immune system but also respiratory health in adults and children. 
 Digestive health: Colostrum is composed of a beneficial combination of bioactives that support digestive health, including immunoglobulins, growth factors, and oligosaccharides. These bioactives work together to maintain and support intestinal integrity and improve nutrient absorption, while its naturally occurring prebiotics feed beneficial bacteria and support a balanced gut in adults and children
 Early life nutrition: While colostrum and breast milk are a critical part of newborn nutrition, research has shown that colostrum has continued benefits in children over the age of one. As a component in early life nutrition, colostrum can help to support children's immune systems, soothe digestive upsets, and otherwise support children's digestive health. 
 Sports nutrition: Bovine colostrum contains several bioactives that help support sports nutrition, including immunoglobulins and growth factors. These bioactives combine to help maintain a healthy immune system during the stress during athletic training, while supporting cellular proliferation and restitution as well as protein synthesis and soft tissue repair.
There is also research suggesting that a large proportion of colostrum is not fit for human consumption "due to tremendous bacterial loads". Salmonella was also detected in 15% of unpasteurised samples. Pasteurisation reduces the bioactive proteins many of the benefits rely upon, however.

Colostrum use in animal husbandry
Colostrum is crucial for newborn farm animals.  They receive no passive transfer of immunity via the placenta before birth, so any antibodies that they need have to be ingested (unless supplied by injection or other artificial means). The ingested antibodies are absorbed from the intestine of the neonate. The newborn animal must receive colostrum within 6 hours of being born for maximal absorption of colostral antibodies to occur. Recent studies indicate that colostrum should be fed to bovines within the first thirty minutes to maximize IgG absorption rates.
 
The role of colostrum for newborn animals is to provide nutrition, and essential protection against infection while the immune and digestive systems are developing and maturing. Bovine colostrum provides macro- and micro-nutrients, as well as growth factors, cytokines, nucleosides, oligosaccharides, natural antimicrobials, antioxidants; and a range of immunoglobulins such as IgG, IgA, IgD, IgM and IgE. It is well established that minimal levels of IgG are essential to prevent failure of passive transfer. The iron-binding glycoproteins lactoferrin and transferrin in bovine colostrum assist in attacking pathogens by impacting their cell membrane and making them more susceptible to the immune systems attack by neutrophils. Cytokines present in bovine colostrum enhance B and T cell maturation and increase endogenous antibody production. They also play a major role in regulation of epithelial cell growth and development, proliferation, and restitution. Transfer factors enhance the activity of T cells. Other growth and immune factors such as IGF-1, IGF-2, FGF, EGF, TGF, PDGF, etc.

Bovine colostrum's components benefit the immune and digestive health of animals of all ages and species. Bovine colostrum's vast array of bioactive components collectively increase resistance to infection and disease caused by a wide range of pathogens including bacteria and viruses. The quality of the colostrum is essential in providing the essential benefits. Both contaminated early bovine colostrum at the farm level or late transition milk or milk are poor sources of the important colostral components necessary to maintain life and achieve and maintain healthy animal maturation and homoeostasis. Bovine colostrum also is beneficial in repairing or healing intestinal damage as well as increasing the absorption of nutrients from the GI tract. These properties and benefits are consistent among human and animal species.

The transition from fetal to neonatal and shift from maternal to environmental reliance requires an abrupt immunological change. In calves, for example, colostrum provides a significant benefit in neonatal intestine development. This includes villus area, circumference, height and height/crypt ratio. Colostrum is critically important to calves and foals in order to prevent failure of passive transfer and death. Calves, foals and piglets with low IgG levels have an increased risk of morbidity and mortality. Bovine colostrum can be used to reduce the duration and severity of infections so it can be a useful tool to include in the reduction of antibiotic use. Finally, another important and valuable benefit of colostrum is in the reduction in scours and increase in average daily weight gain all of which have a significant farmer and ultimately consumer benefit.

Colostrum use in companion animals 
Much like in humans and production animals, companion animal survival in the newborn stage of life is largely dependent upon colostrum. Companion animal immune systems require several weeks to several months in order to fully develop. Maternal antibodies provide benefit for a relatively short period of time so a gap exists with immune sufficiency where an animal is at risk of infection. Like humans, companion animal immune response changes with age where early life and later in life have similarities. That is, an immune bias whereby the animal has less of an ability to fend off infections and greater prevalence of allergy at both ends of the age spectrum. Stress also affects a companion animal's immune system including changes in environment, diet, etc. Maintaining gut microbial balance is key to maintaining a healthy immune system as well as mucosal integrity, similar to humans. Bovine colostrum has been demonstrated to benefit companion animal immunity and digestive health.

Bovine colostrum plays a role in increasing Ig levels, increasing lymphocyte proliferation stimulating activity and increasing phagocytosis activity. These are supported by other components of colostrum which further enhance the activity of the immune response. The iron binding glycoproteins lactoferrin and transferrin in bovine colostrum assist in attacking pathogens by impacting their cell membrane and making them more susceptible to the immune systems attack by neutrophils. Cytokines present in bovine colostrum enhance B and T cell maturation and increase endogenous antibody production. They also play a major role in regulation of epithelial cell growth and development, proliferation, restitution. Transfer factors enhance the activity of T cells. Other growth and immune factors such as IGF-1, IGF-2, FGF, EGF, TGF, PDGF, etc. Colostrum contains glycomacropeptides which help to regulate appetite.

Bovine colostrum has been shown to enhance immune response in animal models including canine, feline and equine animals including maintaining a higher level of vaccine antibody response over time and for a longer period than the vaccine alone. Animals fed colostrum had a significantly higher local immune status resulting in higher IgA through GALT stimulation. Colostrum also plays a key role in reduction or prevention of diarrhea and reduction in respiratory illness.

Bovine colostrum history of study and potential future applications 

Dairy cattle are naturally exposed to pathogens and produce immunoglobulins against them. These antibodies are present in the cow's bloodstream and in the colostrum. These immunoglobulins are specific to many human pathogens, including Escherichia coli, Cryptosporidium parvum, Shigella flexneri, Salmonella species, Staphylococcus species, and rotavirus (which causes diarrhea in infants). Before the development of antibiotics, colostrum was the main source of immunoglobulins used to fight bacteria. In fact, when Albert Sabin made his first oral vaccine against polio, the immunoglobulin he used came from bovine colostrum. When antibiotics began to appear, interest in colostrum waned, but, now that antibiotic-resistant strains of pathogens have developed, interest is once again returning to natural alternatives to antibiotics, namely, colostrum.

Although bovine colostrum has been consumed by humans for centuries,  only in recent decades have we seen an increase in randomized clinical trials to support assertions of health benefits. It is probable that little absorption of intact growth factors and antibodies into the bloodstream occurs, due to digestion in the gastrointestinal tract. However, the presence of casein and other buffering proteins does allow growth factors and other bioactive molecules to pass into the lumen of the small intestine intact, where they can stimulate repair and inhibit microbes, working via local effects. This provides a probable mechanism explaining reductions in gut permeability after colostrum administration in some published studies, while another study found colostrum promising as treatment for distal colitis. Evidence for the beneficial effect of colostrum on extra-gastrointestinal problems is less well developed, due in part to the limited number of randomised double-blind studies published, although a variety of possible uses have been suggested.

The gut plays several important roles including acting as the main pathway for fluid, electrolyte and nutrient absorption while also acting as a barrier to toxic agents present in the gut lumen including acid, digestive enzymes and gut bacteria. It is also a major immunological defence mechanism, detecting natural commensals and triggering immune response when toxic microbes are present. Failure of homeostasis due to trauma, drugs and infectious microbes not only damages the gut but can lead to influx of damaging agents into the bloodstream. These mechanisms have relevance for multiple conditions affecting all areas of the world and socioeconomic groups such as ulcers, inflammation, and infectious diarrhea. There is currently much interest in the potential value of colostrum for the prevention and treatment of these conditions as it is derived from natural sources and can influence damaging factors through multiple pathways including nutritional support, immunological intervention (through its immunoglobulin and other anti-microbial factors) and growth/healing factor constituents. As pointed out by Kelly, inconsistency between results in some published studies may be due in part to variation in dose given and to the timing of the colostrum collection being tested (first milking versus pooled colostrum collected up to day 5 following calving).

Some athletes have used colostrum in an attempt to improve their performance, decrease recovery time, and prevent sickness during peak performance levels. Supplementation with bovine colostrum, 20 grams per day (g/d), in combination with exercise training for eight weeks may increase bone-free lean body mass in active men and women.

Low IGF-1 levels may be associated with dementia in the very elderly, although causation has not been established. Malnutrition can cause low levels of IGF-1, as can obesity. Supplementation with colostrum, which is rich in IGF-1, can be a useful part of a weight reduction program. Although IGF-1 is not absorbed intact by the body, some studies suggest it stimulates the production of IGF-1 when taken as a supplement whereas others do not.

Colostrum also has antioxidant components, such as lactoferrin and hemopexin, which binds free heme in the body.

The Isle of Man had a local delicacy called "Groosniuys", a pudding made with colostrum.
In Finland, a baked cheese called Leipäjuusto is traditionally made with either cow colostrum or reindeer milk.

A sweet cheese-like delicacy called 'Junnu' or 'Ginna' is made with colostrum in the south Indian states of Karnataka, Andhra Pradesh and Telangana. It is made with both cow and buffalo milk; in both cases it is the milk produced on the second day after giving birth which is considered best for making this pudding-like delicacy. Colostrum is in very high demand in these states, resulting in product adulteration.

Hyperimmune colostrum
Hyperimmune colostrum is natural bovine colostrum collected from a population of cows immunized repeatedly with a specific pathogen. The colostrum is collected within 24 hours of the cow giving birth. Antibodies towards the specific pathogens or antigens that were used in the immunization are present in higher levels than in the population before treatment.  Although some papers have been published  stating that specific human pathogens were just as high as in hyperimmune colostrum, and natural colostrum nearly always had higher antibody titers than did the hyperimmune version. Clinical trials have shown that if the immunization is by surface antigens of the bacteria, the Bovine Colostrum Powder  can be used to make tablets capable of binding to the bacteria so that they are excreted in stools. This prevents the successful colonization of the gut, which would otherwise lead to bacteria releasing enterotoxigenic materials.

Proline-rich polypeptides 
These small immune signaling peptides (PRPs) were independently discovered in colostrum and other sources, such as blood plasma, in the United States, Czechoslovakia and Poland. Hence they appear under various names in the literature, including Colostrinin, CLN, transfer factor and PRP. They function as signal transducing molecules that have the unique effect of modulating the immune system, turning it up when the body comes under attack from pathogens or other disease agents, and damping it when the danger is eliminated or neutralized. At first thought to actually transfer immunity from one immune system to another, it now appears that PRPs simply stimulate cell-mediated immunity.

References

External links
 Maryland Cooperative Extension
Benefits of Colostrum
Usage of Bovine Colostrum

 alpha lipid colostrum

Animal products
Biotechnology
Breastfeeding
Breast milk
Milk
Dietary supplements